Thomas Allen Torlakson (born July 19, 1949) is an American educator and politician from California. In 2010, he was elected to the position of California State Superintendent of Public Instruction, a position he served in until 2019. He is a member of the Democratic Party.

He previously served three terms in the California State Assembly, representing the 11th district, which consists of northern portions of Contra Costa County. He also served two terms in the California State Senate, representing the 7th district.

Early life
His younger brother, James Torlakson, is an artist in San Francisco, California.  Another younger brother (Christopher Torlakson) is deceased. Torlakson attended Westmoor High School in Daly City, California. On May 25, 2017, Torlakson issued the commencement address where he graduated from 50 years ago.

Torlakson served in the U.S. Merchant Marine during the Vietnam War from 1967 to 1970.  His assignments included Guam, Vietnam, Thailand and later on Chevron oil tankers to Alaska which was his first job where he was a union member. In 1968, he received the Merchant Marines Vietnam Service Medal. After his maritime service, Torlakson attended the University of California, Berkeley. He earned a B.A. in History in 1971, and an M.A. in Education in 1977. Torlakson is married to Mae Cendana, a member of the Ambrose Recreation and Park District board of directors. He has two daughters, Tiffany and Tamara, from a previous marriage.

First two State Assembly terms
In 1996 Torlakson, then a Contra Costa County Supervisor, ran for the California State Assembly seat of term-limited Bob Campbell (D-Richmond). He defeated George Miller IV, son of veteran  congressman George Miller III, in the Democratic primary. Torlakson campaigned with the slogan, "His own name, his own record." He was easily reelected in 1998.

State Senate
In 2000 Torlakson won an expensive, hard fought campaign to unseat Republican state Senator Richard Rainey (R-Walnut Creek) by 12%. While serving in the State Senate, Torlakson was appointed to chair the important Senate Appropriations Committee.

State Superintendent

Torlakson ran for California State Superintendent of Public Instruction in the 2010 elections, defeating Larry Aceves in the general election held on November 2, 2010. Torlakson replaced Jack O'Connell, who was termed out of office. He was re-elected in 2014 against challenger Marshall Tuck.

As Superintendent, Torlakson was eighth in the line of succession to the office of Governor of California. On Monday, July 25, 2016, Governor Jerry Brown; Lieutenant Governor Gavin Newsom; Senate President Pro Tem Kevin de León; Assembly Speaker Anthony Rendon; Secretary of State Alex Padilla; then Attorney General Kamala Harris; Insurance Commissioner Dave Jones; and Board of Equalization chair Fiona Ma were all out of state attending the 2016 Democratic National Convention in Philadelphia, leaving Torlakson Acting Governor. As Acting Governor, Torlakson proclaimed a state of emergency for the Sand Fire in Los Angeles County and the Soberanes Fire in Monterey County.

Electoral history

References

External links
 Interview on PMAKid.com
 State Assembly Website
 http://www.ucop.edu/state/advocacy/biographies/SDTorlakson07.pdf.
 
 http://www.answers.com/topic/tom-torlakson
 http://journalism.berkeley.edu/projects/election2000/state/legis3.html
 http://halfwaytoconcord.com/?s=torlakson
 Join California Tom Torlakson

1949 births
21st-century American politicians
Democratic Party California state senators
California Superintendents of Public Instruction
Living people
Democratic Party members of the California State Assembly
People from Antioch, California
20th-century American politicians